10 Victoria Road, Karachi, now known as State Guest House was the official residence of the prime minister of Pakistan until 1968 when Prime Minister House was constructed in Islamabad. It was modelled after 10 Downing Street. It is now used as a state guest house and is located on Abdullah Haroon Road.

History
The house was named as 10 Victoria Road by Ra'ana Liaquat Ali Khan.

During the premiership of Liaquat Ali Khan, his spouse, Ra'ana Liaquat Ali Khan founded All Pakistan Women's Association and used to held its conferences at 10 Victoria Road.

Residents
 Liaquat Ali Khan
 Khawaja Nazimuddin
 Mohammad Ali Bogra
 Chaudhry Mohammad Ali
 Huseyn Shaheed Suhrawardy

References

Further reading
  

Prime ministerial residences in Pakistan